The 1992 U.S. Open was the 92nd U.S. Open, held June 18–21 at Pebble Beach Golf Links in Pebble Beach, California. Tom Kite, long considered one of the best players to never win a major, finally broke through with a U.S. Open title, two strokes ahead of runner-up Jeff Sluman.

Gil Morgan was the story of the opening two rounds. He took the first-round lead with a 66, then recorded a second-round 69 for the 36-hole lead. After a birdie at the 3rd hole of the third round, Morgan was at 10-under, becoming the first in U.S. Open history to reach double-digits under-par. He got as low as 12-under after a birdie at the 7th, but then collapsed. He made three double-bogeys the rest of the round, but still held the lead by one over Kite, Ian Woosnam, and Mark Brooks. Morgan finally fell out of the lead after a double-bogey at the 6th in the final round. He eventually finished in 13th place, playing his final 29 holes in 17-over par. As Morgan was falling, Kite played steady golf, recording two birdies at 12 and 14 to offset bogeys at 16 and 17. He finished with an even-par 72 and a 3-under total of 285 for a two-stroke win over Jeff Sluman.

Windy conditions combined with lightning-fast greens made scoring conditions in the final round extremely difficult. Morgan shot an 81, Woosnam, one back at the start of the round, shot 79, Brooks, also one back, shot 84, and Nick Faldo, two back at the start, carded a 77. Colin Montgomerie shot 70 for the joint lowest score of the round and jumped over 25 players to finish in 3rd place. The final-round scoring average was 77.3, the third-highest in post-World War II U.S. Open history.

Greg Norman, who was ranked #7 in the world, did not qualify.

Course layout

Source:

Previous course lengths for major championships
  - par 72, 1982 U.S. Open
  - par 72, 1977 PGA Championship
  - par 72, 1972 U.S. Open

This was the last U.S. Open for a quarter-century to be played at a par-72 course. Since then, it has most often been played to a par of 70, and occasionally 71. Pebble Beach played to par 71 at all three of its subsequent U.S. Opens (2000, 2010, and 2019). The next par-72 course to host the U.S. Open, and the only one to date, was Erin Hills in 2017.

Past champions in the field

Made the cut

Missed the cut 

Source:

Round summaries

First round
Thursday, June 18, 1992

Second round
Friday, June 19, 1992

Amateurs: Duval (+8), Schutte (+9), Voges (+11), Gogel (+17), Pride (+27).

Third round
Saturday, June 20, 1992

Final leaderboard
Sunday, June 21, 1992

Scorecard
Final round

Cumulative tournament scores, relative to par

Source:

References

External links
USGA Championship Database

U.S. Open (golf)
Golf in California
U.S. Open
U.S. Open (golf)
U.S. Open
U.S. Open (golf)